Mark Edele is a historian who studies the Soviet Union. According to Karel C. Berkhoff, Edele is "a highly regarded specialist of the Soviet Union during World War II".

Works

References

Australian historians
Living people
Year of birth missing (living people)
Historians of the Soviet Union
Historians of World War II